Admiral Fletcher may refer to:

Frank Jack Fletcher (1885–1973), admiral in the U.S. Navy during World War II
Frank Friday Fletcher (1855–1928), admiral in the U.S. Navy
William Bartlett Fletcher Sr. (1862–1957), rear admiral in the U.S. Navy